The Citizens Party was a political party in the United States. It was founded in Washington, D.C., by Barry Commoner, who aimed to gather under one banner a nationwide political organization of progressive, environmentalist and liberal groups, many of which were unsatisfied with President Jimmy Carter's administration, for the first time since the dissolution of the national Progressive Party in the 1960s. The Citizens Party registered with the Federal Elections Commission at the end of 1979. Commoner, a professor of environmental science at Washington University in St. Louis, was the head of the Center for the Biology of Natural Systems in St. Louis, Missouri and editor of Science Illustrated magazine.

The Citizens Party platform was very progressive, pro-science, and environmentalist. Some have claimed that it was possibly socialist as well, but this claim arose from a misunderstanding of the economic democracy platform of the party, which appears to be a form of corporatism. Commoner repeatedly espoused opposition to socialism for parts of the economy other than essential infrastructure. His economic democracy idea stated that the business of business is to do business, but that the business of government is to regulate business to prevent abuses.

In all, the party was founded around four essential platforms, including economic democracy.

History

1980 election cycle
The first Citizens Party National Convention met in Cleveland, Ohio, in the Cleveland Plaza Hotel from April 10 to 13, 1980. There were 260 delegates from 30 states present. The "proposals presented at the convention reportedly numbered some 300 items, a list largely irreducible to a manageable platform ... Units of the party organization on the state level thus became more or less responsible for delineating their own briefer versions of the list of goals" (Kruschke, p. 46). The party nominated Barry Commoner and LaDonna Harris (then, at that time, the wife of Democratic senator Fred Harris of Oklahoma) for president and vice president respectively. La Donna Harris was "a leading feminist and a Comanche Indian [who] labeled herself as 'a woman of color.'"

In order to increase public awareness of its existence, the Citizens Party ran a commercial on 600 radio stations which used profanity (the advertisement began with an actor exclaiming: "Bullshit! ... Carter, Reagan and Anderson, it's all bullshit!"). Several of the radio stations tried to remove the profanity, but the Federal Communications Commission forbade them to do so.

As the party's presidential candidate in 1980, Commoner achieved ballot status in 29 states (22 and DC under the Citizens Party label, six as an Independent, and in Pennsylvania with the Consumer Party), although his major activity was centered in the large states of California, Illinois, Michigan, New York, and Pennsylvania.

In addition to the national ticket in the presidential election, twenty-two other Citizens candidates appeared on the ballot in various states, including three for the U.S. Senate and eleven for the U.S. House. Commoner received 221,083 votes. Although Commoner did not garner more than one percent in any state, the party received enough support to be the first minor party to qualify for federal matching funds (about $157,000) for the 1984 elections.

1982 election cycle
In 1981, the Citizens Party won an election for the first time when Terry Bouricius was elected to the board of Aldermen in Burlington, Vermont. In 1982, the Citizens Party fielded two candidates for governorships (Pennsylvania and Texas), three candidates for the Senate (Pennsylvania, Texas, and Vermont), and 15 candidates for the U.S. House.

1984 election cycle
In 1984, the Citizens Party held its second national convention at Hamline University in St. Paul, Minnesota, from August 10 to 12, 1984. There were 125 delegates from 30 states present. The convention nominated Sonia Johnson of Virginia, “a radical feminist,” for president and Richard Walton of Rhode Island for vice president. Johnson had been excommunicated from the LDS Church in 1979 as a result of her outspoken support of the Equal Rights Amendment. In 1982 Johnson undertook a publicized 37-day fast which was meant to encourage the Illinois legislature to ratify the ERA.

Two other minor parties endorsed the Citizens ticket in 1984. The Socialist Party USA National Convention in New York City from September 3 to 5, 1983 voted to try to run a joint ticket with the Citizens Party, and the Peace and Freedom Party in California endorsed Johnson for president (although it ran Emma Wong Mar for vice president).

Despite the two additional endorsements, the Citizens Party suffered serious setbacks during 1984. It ran fewer candidates for office: one for the Senate (Illinois), one for Governor (Vermont), and two for the U.S. House. Johnson appeared on the ballot in thirteen states as the Citizens candidate, two as an Independent, one (Arkansas) as the Citizens Group nominee, and one (Pennsylvania) as the Consumer nominee. The Citizens Party vote fell by two thirds, to 72,153, although Johnson significantly improved upon Commoner's totals in Pennsylvania and Louisiana.

1986 election cycle and party dissolution
In the 1986 election, the Citizens Party once again offered four candidates: two for governor (Pennsylvania and Rhode Island), one for the Senate (Pennsylvania), and one for the U.S. House (Minnesota). The Pennsylvania candidates used the Consumer Party label.

After the disappointing number of votes cast in favor of the Citizens Party nominees, it dissolved. The 1987 Socialist Party National Convention nominated its own ticket of Willa Kenoyer (a former co-chair of the Citizens Party) and Ron Ehrenreich for the 1988 presidential election, while the Consumer Party in Pennsylvania resumed its separate existence, picking up the remaining pieces of the Citizens Party.

Presidential election summary
The Citizens Party nominated two candidates for President of the United States:

See also
 1980 United States presidential election
 1984 United States presidential election
 Citizens Party of the United States (2011–present)

Footnotes

Further reading

 Citizens Party, "News from National: Campaign Summaries," Citizens Party News Bulletin, June 17, 1981. —1980 vote totals.
 Citizens Party, Platform of the Citizens/Consumer Party" As Adopted at Party Convention, April 1980. n.c.: Citizens Party, 1980.
  Jeffrey Gale, Bullshit: The Media As Power Brokers in Presidential Elections. Bold Hawk Press, 1988.
 Charles S. Hauss, "Citizens Party," in L. Sandy Maisel (ed.) Political Parties and Elections in the United States. New York: Garland Publishing, 1991; pg. 147.
 James T. Havel, U.S. Presidential Candidates and the Elections. New York: Macmillan Library Reference USA, 1996.
 Earl R. Kruschke (ed.) "Citizens’ Party" in Encyclopedia of Third Parties in the United States. Santa Barbara CA: ABC-CLIO, 1991; pg. 45.
 New York Citizens Party, The Citizens Party Salutes Gay Pride Week; Vote for Barry Commoner for President and LaDonna Harris for Vice-President in 1980.  New York: Citizens Party, 1980.
 Edward L. Schapsmeier and Frederick H. Schapsmeier (eds.), "Citizen’s Party (CP)," in Political Parties and Civic Action Groups. Westport CT: Greenwood Press, 1981; pg. 96.

Citizens Party
Political parties established in 1979
1979 establishments in the United States
Political parties disestablished in 1987
1987 disestablishments in the United States
Equal Rights Amendment